The 2018–19 Aruban Division di Honor is the 58th season of the Aruban Division di Honor, the top division football competition in Aruba. The season began on 19 October 2018.

RCA won the league championship, beating Nacional in the final. It was RCA's 17th Aruban domestic league championship, and their first since 2016.

Changes from 2017–18 
Juventud TL were relegated to the Division Uno. Brazil Juniors were promoted from the Division Uno.

Teams 

There were 10 clubs that competed during the season.

Regular season

Caya 4

Championship final

First leg

Second leg

Third leg

RCA won championship qualified for Caribbean Club Shield.

Top goalscorers 

Source.

References

External links
Arubaanse Voetbal Bond

Aruban Division di Honor seasons
Aruba
1